Ali Mardan Khan (died April 1657) was a Kurdish military leader and administrator, serving under the Safavid kings Shah Abbas I and Shah Safi, and later the Mughal ruler Shah Jahan. He was the son of Ganj Ali Khan. After surrendering the city of Qandahar, part of the easternmost territories of the Safavids to the Mughals in 1638, he served with distinction in the Mughal administration, earning the highest honors of the Mughal court.

Career
Ali Mardan Khan was a Kurd of the Zig tribe, and son of Safavid official Ganj Ali Khan. In 1624, Ali Mardan Khan inherited his father's position when he was appointed governor of Kerman, Sistan, and Qandahar by the Safavid emperor Shah Abbas. Like his father, Ali Mardan Khan governed from the city of Qandahar. In 1625, control of Kerman was handed over to Tahmasp Qoli Khan for administrative reasons.

In 1632, Ali Mardan Khan began a series of correspondences with the Mughal court, culminating in the official surrender of his territories (including Qandahar) to the Mughal emperor Shah Jahan in March 1638. The likely reason for his actions was fear of assassination by the Safavid ruler Shah Safi, who had already caused the death or disappearance of several prominent individuals in the Safavid government. The handover of Qandahar's fortress was highlighted in Mughal and Safavid chronicles, being applauded and condemned respectively. Ali Mardan Khan's defection was generously rewarded by Shah Jahan, who sent him several gifts.

Ali Mardan Khan experienced a meteoric rise in Mughal government, becoming a member with important responsibilities and a highly favoured noble of Shah Jahan. By the year 1643, he had become the highest ranked in the Mughal nobility by reaching a rank of 7000 zat (infantry) and 7000 sowar. He was also honoured with the title Amir al-Umara (lord of the lords). Early in his tenure (1638) he was appointed governor of Kashmir; he was later additionally appointed to the Punjab, and finally was moved to a strategic position as governor of Kabul, which he held until his death.

In 1657, Ali Mardan Khan fell ill and passed away due to a pandemic in the Indian subcontinent. He was buried in the tomb of his mother, today the Tomb of Ali Mardan Khan.

Architecture 
Ali Mardan Khan was a notable architectural patron. As a Safavid official, he is known to have constructed the cistern of the Ganj Ali Khan complex in Kerman, and built multiple gardens in Qandahar.His most notable architectural feat as a Mughal official was the creation of a canal that brought water to the suburbs of Lahore from the Ravi River, which was more than 100 miles away. This enabled the creation of Lahore's Shalimar Bagh. Another significant architectural creation was an Iranian-style covered bazaar in Peshawar, which impressed Shah Jahan and inspired the marketplace of his capital city Shahjahanabad. Ali Mardan Khan built the Chashme Shahi garden in Srinagar in addition to other gardens at Shahjahanabad and Peshawar. He is also credited with strengthening fortifications at Qandahar and undertaking civic building projects in Kabul. The tomb of Ali Mardan Khan is probably a commission by him.

References

External links

Daily Times: Driving through history

Year of birth missing
1657 deaths
Mughal nobility
Subahdars of Lahore
Subahdars of Kashmir
17th-century soldiers
Safavid governors of Qandahar
Iranian emigrants to the Mughal Empire
17th-century people of Safavid Iran
Iranian Kurdish people